Statistics of First League of FR Yugoslavia for the 1994–95 season.

Overview 
Just as the previous season, the league consisted of 2 groups, A and B, each containing 10 clubs. Both groups were played in league system. By winter break all clubs in each group had met each other twice, home and away, with the bottom four from A group moving to group B, and being replaced by the top four from the B group. At the end of the season the same situation happened with four teams being replaced from A and B groups, and in addition, the bottom three clubs from the B group were relegated into the Second League of FR Yugoslavia for the next season and replaced by the top three from that league.

At the end of the season Red Star Belgrade became champions.

FK Partizan striker Savo Milošević become the league's top-scorer for second consecutive time, this time with 30 goals.

The relegated clubs were FK Spartak Subotica, FK Sutjeska Nikšić, FK Rudar Pljevlja.

That was the first season when Yugoslav clubs again qualified to the UEFA competitions after three years of ban due to UN embargo.

Teams

Autumn

IA league

Table

Results

IB league

Table

Results

Spring

IA league

Table

Results

IB league

Table

Results

UEFA Cup Playoff 

Vojvodina was qualified to the 1995–96 UEFA Cup but they are not admitted, along with Partizan, because the country coefficient of Yugoslavia has been recalculated due to the split up. Budućnost Podgorica was qualified to the 1995 UEFA Intertoto Cup.

Winning squad
Champions: Red Star Belgrade (coach: Ljupko Petrović)

Players (league matches/league goals)
  Dejan Petković (36/8)
  Marko Perović (33/7)
  Ivan Adžić (33/6)
  Darko Kovačević (31/24)
  Zvonko Milojević (31/0) -goalkeeper-
  Nebojša Krupniković (30/23)
  Dejan Stefanović (30/9)
  Nenad Sakić (29/0)
  Mitko Stojkovski (28/1)
  Goran Đorović (28/0)
  Bratislav Živković (25/2)
  Nikola Radmanović (24/0)
  Goran Stojiljković (17/7)
  Srđan Bajčetić (14/1) sold to Celta de Vigo after 1st half of the season
  Predrag Stanković (13/2)
  Jovan Stanković (13/0)
  Darko Pivaljević (7/2)
  Zoran Riznić (7/2)
  Aleksandar Kristić (7/0)
  Dejan Stanković (7/0)
  Zoran Mašić (6/3)
  Milan Simeunović (4/0) -goalkeeper-
  Perica Ognjenović (3/0)
  Zoran Đorović (2/0)
  Vinko Marinović (2/0)
  Božidar Bandović (1/0)
  Miodrag Božović (1/0)
  Žarko Dragaš (1/0)
  Darko Ljubojević (1/0)
  Rade Mojović (1/0) -goalkeeper-

Top goalscorers

References

External links 
 Table at RSSSF

Yugoslav First League seasons
Yugo
1994–95 in Yugoslav football